Zygosaurus is an extinct genus of dissorophid temnospondyl from the Middle-Late Permian of Russia. It was described in 1848 by Eduard Eichwald, making it the first dissorophid to be described and is known from a single species, Zygosaurus lucius. The location of the holotype, and only known specimen, is unknown, and although casts are reposited in several institutions, little is known about this taxon beyond qualitative aspects of the skull (e.g., preorbital length twice as long as postorbital length; skull width greatest at mid-length of orbits). The skull was estimated to be around 20 cm in length, making it one of the largest dissorophids, being only slightly smaller than Kamacops.

References 

Dissorophids
Permian temnospondyls
Fossils of Russia
Prehistoric amphibian genera